
This is a list of the heteropteran bugs recorded from Britain:

Cimicomorpha

Cimicoidea

Anthocoridae

Anthocorinae

Acompocoris
 Acompocoris alpinus
 Acompocoris pygmaeus

Anthocoris
 Anthocoris amplicollis
 Anthocoris butleri
 Anthocoris confusus
 Anthocoris gallarum-ulmi
 Anthocoris limbatus
 Anthocoris minki
 Anthocoris nemoralis
 Anthocoris nemorum
 Anthocoris pilosus
 Anthocoris sarothamni
 Anthocoris simulans
 Anthocoris visci

Elatophilus
 Elatophilus nigricornis

Orius
 Orius laevigatus
 Orius laticollis
 Orius majusculus
 Orius niger
 Orius vicinus

Temnostethus
 Temnostethus gracilis
 Temnostethus pusillus
 Temnostethus tibialis

Tetraphleps
 Tetraphleps bicuspis

Lyctocoridae

Brachysteles

 Brachysteles parvicornis

Buchananiella

 Buchananiella continua

Cardiastethus

 Cardiastethus fasciiventris

Dufouriellus

 Dufouriellus ater

Lyctocoris

 Lyctocoris campestris

Xylocoridea

 Xylocoridea brevipennis

Xylocoris

 Xylocoris cursitans
 Xylocoris formicetorum
 Xylocoris galactinus

Cimicidae

Cimex

 Cimex columbarius
 Cimex dissimilis
 Cimex lectularius
 Cimex pipistrelli

Oeciacus

 Oeciacus hirundinis

Microphysidae

Loricula

 Loricula coleoptrata
 Loricula distinguenda
 Loricula elegantula
 Loricula exilis
 Loricula inconspicua
 Loricula pselaphiformis
 Loricula ruficeps

Nabidae

Himacerus

 Himacerus apterus
 Himacerus mirmicoides
 Himacerus boops
 Himacerus major

Nabis

 Nabis brevis
 Nabis ericetorum
 Nabis ferus
 Nabis flavomarginatus
 Nabis limbatus
 Nabis lineatus
 Nabis pseudoferus
 Nabis rugosus

Prostemma

 Prostemma guttula

Miroidea

Miridae

Bryocorinae

Bryocoris
 Bryocoris pteridis

Campyloneura
 Campyloneura virgula

Dicyphus
 Dicyphus annulatus
 Dicyphus constrictus
 Dicyphus epilobii
 Dicyphus errans
 Dicyphus escalerae
 Dicyphus globulifer
 Dicyphus pallicornis
 Dicyphus pallidus
 Dicyphus stachydis

Macrolophus
 Macrolophus pygmaeus
 Macrolophus rubi

Monalocoris
 Monalocoris filicis

Tupiocoris
 Tupiocoris rhododendri

Deraeocorinae

Alloeotomus
 Alloeotomus gothicus

Bothynotus
 Bothynotus pilosus

Deraeocoris
 Deraeocoris flavilinea
 Deraeocoris lutescens
 Deraeocoris olivaceus
 Deraeocoris ruber
 Deraeocoris scutellaris

Mirinae

Acetropis
 Acetropis gimmerthalii

Adelphocoris
 Adelphocoris lineolatus
 Adelphocoris seticornis
 Adelphocoris ticinensis

Agnocoris
 Agnocoris reclairei

Apolygus
 Apolygus limbatus
 Apolygus lucorum
 Apolygus spinolae

Calocoris
 Calocoris alpestris
 Calocoris norwegicus
 Calocoris roseomaculatus

Camptozygum
 Camptozygum aequale

Capsodes
 Capsodes flavomarginatus
 Capsodes gothicus
 Capsodes sulcatus

Capsus
 Capsus ater
 Capsus wagneri

Charagochilus
 Charagochilus gyllenhalii
 Charagochilus weberi

Closterotomus
 Closterotomus fulvomaculatus
 Closterotomus trivialis

Dichrooscytus
 Dichrooscytus gustavi
 Dichrooscytus rufipennis

Grypocoris
 Grypocoris stysi

Hadrodemus
 Hadrodemus m-flavum

Leptopterna
 Leptopterna dolabrata
 Leptopterna ferrugata

Liocoris
 Liocoris tripustulatus

Lygocoris
 Lygocoris pabulinus
 Lygocoris rugicollis

Lygus
 Lygus maritimus
 Lygus pratensis
 Lygus punctatus
 Lygus rugulipennis
 Lygus wagneri

Megacoelum
 Megacoelum infusum

Pseudomegacoelum
 Pseudomegacoelum beckeri (Fieber, 1870) - synonym Megacoelum beckeri

Megaloceroea
 Megaloceroea recticornis

Miridius
 Miridius quadrivirgatus

Miris
 Miris striatus

Myrmecoris
 Myrmecoris gracilis

Neolygus
 Neolygus contaminatus
 Neolygus populi
 Neolygus viridis

Notostira
 Notostira elongata
 Notostira erratica

Orthops
 Orthops basalis
 Orthops campestris
 Orthops kalmii

Pantilius
 Pantilius tunicatus

Phytocoris
 Phytocoris dimidiatus
 Phytocoris insignis
 Phytocoris longipennis
 Phytocoris pini
 Phytocoris populi
 Phytocoris reuteri
 Phytocoris tiliae
 Phytocoris ulmi
 Phytocoris varipes

Pinalitus
 Pinalitus atomarius
 Pinalitus cervinus
 Pinalitus rubricatus
 Pinalitus viscicola

Pithanus
 Pithanus maerkelii

Polymerus
 Polymerus nigrita
 Polymerus palustris
 Polymerus unifasciatus
 Polymerus vulneratus

Rhabdomiris
 Rhabdomiris striatellus

Stenodema
 Stenodema calcarata
 Stenodema holsata
 Stenodema laevigatum
 Stenodema trispinosa

Stenotus
 Stenotus binotatus

Teratocoris
 Teratocoris antennatus
 Teratocoris caricis
 Teratocoris saundersi
 Teratocoris viridis

Trigonotylus
 Trigonotylus caelestialium
 Trigonotylus psammaecolor
 Trigonotylus ruficornis

Tropidosteptes
 Tropidosteptes pacificus

Zygimus
 Zygimus nigriceps

Orthotylinae

Blepharidopterus
 Blepharidopterus angulatus
 Blepharidopterus diaphanus

Brachynotocoris
 Brachynotocoris puncticornis

Cyllecoris
 Cyllecoris histrionius

Cyrtorhinus
 Cyrtorhinus caricis

Dryophilocoris
 Dryophilocoris flavoquadrimaculatus

Fieberocapsus
 Fieberocapsus flaveolus

Globiceps
 Globiceps flavomaculatus
 Globiceps fulvicollis
 Globiceps juniperi

Halticus
 Halticus apterus
 Halticus luteicollis
 Halticus macrocephalus
 Halticus saltator

Heterocordylus
 Heterocordylus genistae
 Heterocordylus tibialis

Heterotoma
 Heterotoma planicornis

Malacocoris
 Malacocoris chlorizans

Mecomma
 Mecomma ambulans
 Mecomma dispar

Orthocephalus
 Orthocephalus coriaceus
 Orthocephalus saltator

Orthotylus
 Orthotylus adenocarpi
 Orthotylus bilineatus
 Orthotylus caprai
 Orthotylus concolor
 Orthotylus ericetorum
 Orthotylus flavinervis
 Orthotylus flavosparsus
 Orthotylus fuscescens
 Orthotylus marginalis
 Orthotylus moncreaffi
 Orthotylus nassatus
 Orthotylus ochrotrichus
 Orthotylus prasinus
 Orthotylus rubidus
 Orthotylus tenellus
 Orthotylus virens
 Orthotylus virescens
 Orthotylus viridinervis

Pachytomella
 Pachytomella parallela

Platycranus
 Platycranus bicolor

Pseudoloxops
 Pseudoloxops coccineus

Reuteria
 Reuteria marqueti

Strongylocoris
 Strongylocoris leucocephalus
 Strongylocoris luridus

Phylinae

Amblytylus
 Amblytylus brevicollis
 Amblytylus delicatus
 Amblytylus nasutus

Asciodema
 Asciodema obsoleta

Atractotomus
 Atractotomus magnicornis
 Atractotomus mali
 Atractotomus parvulus

Brachyarthrum
 Brachyarthrum limitatum

Campylomma
 Campylomma annulicorne
 Campylomma verbasci

Chlamydatus
 Chlamydatus evanescens
 Chlamydatus pulicarius
 Chlamydatus pullus
 Chlamydatus saltitans
 Chlamydatus wilkinsoni

Compsidolon
 Compsidolon salicellum

Conostethus
 Conostethus brevis
 Conostethus griseus
 Conostethus roseus
 Conostethus venustus

Europiella
 Europiella artemisiae
 Europiella decolor

Hallodapus
 Hallodapus montandoni
 Hallodapus rufescens

Harpocera
 Harpocera thoracica

Hoplomachus
 Hoplomachus thunbergii

Hypseloecus
 Hypseloecus visci

Lophus
 Lophus decolor

Macrotylus
 Macrotylus horvathi
 Macrotylus paykulli
 Macrotylus solitarius

Megalocoleus
 Megalocoleus molliculus
 Megalocoleus tanaceti

Monosynamma
 Monosynamma bohemanni
 Monosynamma maritimum
 Monosynamma sabulicola

Oncotylus
 Oncotylus viridiflavus

Orthonotus
 Orthonotus rufifrons

Parapsallus
 Parapsallus vitellinus

Phoenicocoris
 Phoenicocoris obscurellus

Phylus

 Phylus coryli
 Phylus melanocephalus

Pilophorus
 Pilophorus cinnamopterus
 Pilophorus clavatus
 Pilophorus confusus
 Pilophorus perplexus

Placochilus
 Placochilus seladonicus

Plagiognathus
 Plagiognathus arbustorum
 Plagiognathus chrysanthemi

Plesiodema
 Plesiodema pinetella

Psallodema
 Psallodema fieberi

Psallus
 Psallus albicinctus
 Psallus ambiguus
 Psallus assimilis
 Psallus betuleti
 Psallus confusus
 Psallus falleni
 Psallus flavellus
 Psallus haematodes
 Psallus lepidus
 Psallus luridus
 Psallus mollis
 Psallus montanus
 Psallus perrisi
 Psallus pseudoplatani
 Psallus quercus
 Psallus salicis
 Psallus variabilis
 Psallus varians
 Psallus wagneri

Salicarus
 Salicarus roseri

Sthenarus
 Sthenarus rotermundi

Systellonotus
 Systellonotus triguttatus

Tinicephalus
 Tinicephalus hortulanus

Tuponia
 Tuponia brevirostris
 Tuponia mixticolor

Tytthus
 Tytthus pubescens
 Tytthus pygmaeus

Tingidae

Acalypta

 Acalypta brunnea
 Acalypta carinata
 Acalypta nigrina
 Acalypta parvula
 Acalypta platycheila

Agramma

 Agramma laetum

Campylosteira

 Campylosteira verna

Catoplatus

 Catoplatus fabricii

Corythucha

 Corythucha ciliata

Derephysia

 Derephysia foliacea

Dictyla

 Dictyla convergens

Dictyonota

 Dictyonota fuliginosa
 Dictyonota strichnocera

Kalama

 Kalama tricornis

Lasiacantha

 Lasiacantha capucina

Oncochila

 Oncochila simplex

Physatocheila

 Physatocheila dumetorum
 Physatocheila harwoodi
 Physatocheila smreczynskii

Stephanitis

 Stephanitis rhododendri
 Stephanitis takeyai

Tingis

 Tingis ampliata
 Tingis angustata
 Tingis cardui
 Tingis reticulata

Reduviidae

Emesinae

Empicoris
 Empicoris baerensprungi
 Empicoris culiciformis
 Empicoris vagabundus

Harpactorinae

Coranus
 Coranus aethiops
 Coranus subapterus
 Coranus woodroffei

Reduviinae

Reduvius
 Reduvius personatus

Stenopodainae

Oncocephalus
 Oncocephalus pilicornis

Pygolampis
 Pygolampis bidentata

Dipsocoromorpha

Dipsocoroidea

Ceratocombidae

Ceratocombus

 Ceratocombus coleoptratus

Dipsocoridae
Cryptostemma
 Cryptostemma alienum - synonym Pachycoleus alienum
Pachycoleus
 Pachycoleus waltli

Leptopodomorpha

Saldoidea

Aepophilidae

Aepophilus

 Aepophilus bonnairei

Saldidae

Chiloxanthinae

Chiloxanthus
 Chiloxanthus pilosus

Saldinae

Chartoscirta
 Chartoscirta cincta
 Chartoscirta cocksii
 Chartoscirta elegantula

Halosalda
 Halosalda lateralis

Micracanthia
 Micracanthia marginalis

Salda
 Salda littoralis
 Salda morio
 Salda muelleri

Saldula
 Saldula arenicola
 Saldula c-album
 Saldula fucicola
 Saldula melanoscela
 Saldula opacula
 Saldula orthochila
 Saldula pallipes
 Saldula palustris
 Saldula pilosella
 Saldula saltatoria
 Saldula scotica
 Saldula setulosa

Teloleuca
 Teloleuca pellucens

Nepomorpha

Corixoidea

Corixidae

Corixinae

Arctocorisa
 Arctocorisa carinata
 Arctocorisa germari

Callicorixa
 Callicorixa praeusta
 Callicorixa wollastoni

Corixa
 Corixa affinis
 Corixa dentipes
 Corixa iberica
 Corixa panzeri
 Corixa punctata

Glaenocorisa
 Glaenocorisa cavifrons
 Glaenocorisa propinqua

Hesperocorixa
 Hesperocorixa castanea
 Hesperocorixa linnaei
 Hesperocorixa moesta
 Hesperocorixa sahlbergi

Paracorixa
 Paracorixa concinna

Sigara
 Sigara distincta
 Sigara dorsalis
 Sigara falleni
 Sigara fallenoidea
 Sigara fossarum
 Sigara iactans
 Sigara lateralis
 Sigara limitata
 Sigara longipalis
 Sigara nigrolineata
 Sigara scotti
 Sigara selecta
 Sigara semistriata
 Sigara stagnalis
 Sigara striata
 Sigara venusta

Cymatiainae

Cymatia
 Cymatia bonsdorffii
 Cymatia coleoptrata
 Cymatia rogenhoferi

Micronectinae

Micronecta
 Micronecta griseola
 Micronecta minutissima
 Micronecta poweri
 Micronecta scholtzi

Gerroidea

Gerridae

Aquarius

 Aquarius najas
 Aquarius paludum

Gerris

 Gerris argentatus
 Gerris costae
 Gerris gibbifer
 Gerris lacustris
 Gerris lateralis
 Gerris odontogaster
 Gerris thoracicus

Limnoporus

 Limnoporus rufoscutellatus

Veliidae

Microvelia

 Microvelia buenoi
 Microvelia pygmaea
 Microvelia reticulata

Velia

 Velia caprai
 Velia saulii

Hebroidea

Hebridae

Hebrus

 Hebrus pusillus
 Hebrus ruficeps

Hydrometroidea

Hydrometridae

Hydrometra

 Hydrometra gracilenta
 Hydrometra stagnorum

Mesovelioidea

Mesoveliidae

Mesovelia

 Mesovelia furcata

Naucoroidea

Aphelocheiridae

Aphelocheirus

 Aphelocheirus aestivalis

Naucoridae

Naucorinae

Naucoris
 Naucoris maculatus

Ilyocoris
 Ilyocoris cimicoides

Nepoidea

Nepidae

Nepinae

Nepa
 Nepa cinerea

Ranatrinae

Ranatra
 Ranatra linearis

Notonectoidea

Notonectidae

Notonecta

 Notonecta glauca
 Notonecta maculata
 Notonecta obliqua
 Notonecta viridis

Pleoidea

Pleidae

Plea

 Plea minutissima

Pentatomomorpha

Aradoidea

Aradidae

Aneurinae

Aneurus
 Aneurus avenius

Aradinae

Aradus
 Aradus aterrimus
 Aradus betulae
 Aradus cinnamomeus
 Aradus corticalis
 Aradus depressus

Aneurus
 Aneurus laevis

Coreoidea

Alydidae

Alydus

 Alydus calcaratus

Coreidae

Coreinae

Coreus
 Coreus marginatus

Enoplops
 Enoplops scapha

Gonocerus
 Gonocerus acuteangulatus

Leptoglossus
 Leptoglossus occidentalis

Spathocera
 Spathocera dalmanii

Syromastus
 Syromastus rhombeus

Pseudophloeinae

Arenocoris
 Arenocoris falleni
 Arenocoris waltlii

Bathysolen
 Bathysolen nubilus

Ceraleptus
 Ceraleptus lividus

Coriomeris
 Coriomeris denticulatus

Rhopalidae

Brachycarenus

 Brachycarenus tigrinus

Chorosoma

 Chorosoma schillingii

Corizus

 Corizus hyoscyami

Liorhyssus

 Liorhyssus hyalinus

Myrmus

 Myrmus miriformis

Rhopalus

 Rhopalus maculatus
 Rhopalus parumpunctatus
 Rhopalus rufus
 Rhopalus subrufus

Stictopleurus

 Stictopleurus abutilon
 Stictopleurus punctatonervosus

Stenocephalidae

Dicranocephalus

 Dicranocephalus agilis
 Dicranocephalus albipes
 Dicranocephalus medius

Lygaeoidea

Berytidae

Berytinae

Berytinus
 Berytinus clavipes
 Berytinus crassipes
 Berytinus hirticornis
 Berytinus minor
 Berytinus montivagus
 Berytinus signoreti

Neides
 Neides tipularius

Gampsocorinae

Gampsocoris
 Gampsocoris punctipes

Metacanthinae

Metatropis
 Metatropis rufescens

Lygaeidae

Artheneinae

Chilacis
 Chilacis typhae

Blissinae

Ischnodemus
 Ischnodemus quadratus
 Ischnodemus sabuleti

Cyminae

Cymus
 Cymus aurescens
 Cymus claviculus
 Cymus glandicolor
 Cymus melanocephalus

Henestarinae

Henestaris
 Henestaris halophilus
 Henestaris laticeps

Heterogastrinae

Heterogaster
 Heterogaster artemisiae
 Heterogaster urticae

Ischnorhynchinae

Kleidocerys
 Kleidocerys ericae
 Kleidocerys resedae

Lygaeinae

Arocatus
 Arocatus longiceps

Lygaeus
 Lygaeus equestris
 Lygaeus simulans

Orsillinae

Nysius
 Nysius cymoides
 Nysius ericae
 Nysius graminicola
 Nysius helveticus
 Nysius huttoni
 Nysius senecionis
 Nysius thymi

Orsillus
 Orsillus depressus

Ortholomus
 Ortholomus punctipennis

Oxycareninae

Macroplax
 Macroplax preyssleri

Metopoplax
 Metopoplax ditomoides
 Metopoplax fuscinervis

Rhyparochrominae

Acompus
 Acompus pallipes
 Acompus rufipes

Aphanus
 Aphanus rolandri

Beosus
 Beosus maritimus

Drymus
 Drymus brunneus
 Drymus latus
 Drymus pilicornis
 Drymus pilipes
 Drymus pumilio
 Drymus ryei
 Drymus sylvaticus

Emblethis
 Emblethis denticollis
 Emblethis griseus

Eremocoris
 Eremocoris abietis
 Eremocoris fenestratus
 Eremocoris plebejus
 Eremocoris podagricus

Gastrodes
 Gastrodes abietum
 Gastrodes grossipes

Graptopeltus
 Graptopeltus lynceus

Ischnocoris
 Ischnocoris angustulus

Lamproplax
 Lamproplax picea

Lasiosomus
 Lasiosomus enervis

Macrodema
 Macrodema micropterum

Megalonotus
 Megalonotus antennatus
 Megalonotus chiragra
 Megalonotus dilatatus
 Megalonotus emarginatus
 Megalonotus praetextatus
 Megalonotus sabulicola

Notochilus
 Notochilus limbatus

Pachybrachius
 Pachybrachius fracticollis
 Pachybrachius luridus

Peritrechus
 Peritrechus angusticollis
 Peritrechus convivus
 Peritrechus geniculatus
 Peritrechus gracilicornis
 Peritrechus lundii
 Peritrechus nubilus

Pionosomus
 Pionosomus varius

Plinthisus
 Plinthisus brevipennis

Pterotmetus
 Pterotmetus staphyliniformis

Raglius
 Raglius alboacuminatus

Rhyparochromus
 Rhyparochromus pini
 Rhyparochromus vulgaris

Scolopostethus
 Scolopostethus affinis
 Scolopostethus decoratus
 Scolopostethus grandis
 Scolopostethus pictus
 Scolopostethus puberulus
 Scolopostethus thomsoni

Sphragisticus
 Sphragisticus nebulosus

Stygnocoris
 Stygnocoris fuligineus
 Stygnocoris rusticus
 Stygnocoris sabulosus

Taphropeltus
 Taphropeltus contractus
 Taphropeltus hamulatus

Trapezonotus
 Trapezonotus arenarius
 Trapezonotus desertus
 Trapezonotus dispar
 Trapezonotus ullrichi

Tropistethus
 Tropistethus holosericeus

Xanthochilus
 Xanthochilus quadratus

Pyrrhocoridae

Pyrrhocoris

 Pyrrhocoris apterus

Pentatomoidea

Acanthosomatidae

Acanthosoma

 Acanthosoma haemorrhoidale

Cyphostethus

 Cyphostethus tristriatus

Elasmostethus

 Elasmostethus interstinctus

Elasmucha

 Elasmucha ferrugata
 Elasmucha grisea

Family Cydnidae

Cydninae: tribe Geotomini

Byrsinus 
 Byrsinus flavicornis

Sehirinae

Adomerus
 Adomerus biguttatus

Canthophorus
 Canthophorus impressus

Geotomus
 Geotomus punctulatus

Legnotus
 Legnotus limbosus
 Legnotus picipes

Sehirus
 Sehirus luctuosus

Tritomegas
 Tritomegas bicolor
 Tritomegas sexmaculatus

Family Pentatomidae

Asopinae

Jalla
 Jalla dumosa

Picromerus
 Picromerus bidens

Rhacognathus
 Rhacognathus punctatus

Troilus
 Troilus luridus

Zicrona
 Zicrona caerulea

Pentatominae

Aelia
 Aelia acuminata

Carpocoris
 Carpocoris pudicus
 Carpocoris purpureipennis

Chlorochroa
(synonym Pitedia)
 Chlorochroa juniperina

Dolycoris
 Dolycoris baccarum

Eurydema
 Eurydema dominulus
 Eurydema oleracea
 Eurydema ornata

Eysarcoris
 Eysarcoris aeneus
 Eysarcoris venustissimus

Neottiglossa
 Neottiglossa pusilla

Nezara
 Nezara viridula

Palomena
 Palomena prasina

Pentatoma
 Pentatoma rufipes

Peribalus
 Peribalus strictus

Piezodorus
 Piezodorus lituratus

Rhaphigaster
 Rhaphigaster nebulosa

Sciocoris
 Sciocoris cursitans

Podopinae

Podops
 Podops inuncta

Scutelleridae

Eurygastrinae

Eurygaster
 Eurygaster austriaca
 Eurygaster maura
 Eurygaster testudinaria

Scutelleridae

Odontoscelis
 Odontoscelis fuliginosa
 Odontoscelis lineola

Thyreocoridae

Thyreocoris

 Thyreocoris scarabaeoides

Piesmatoidea

Piesmatidae

Parapiesma

 Parapiesma quadratum

Piesma

 Piesma maculatum

Notes

References

 Southwood, T. R. E. and Leston, Dennis (1959) Land and Water Bugs of the British Isles Warne
 Ryan, Rob (2012) An addendum to Southwood and Leston's Land and Water Bugs of the British Isles British Journal of Entomology and Natural History 25(4): 205-215
 Foster, Stuart (2013) Coranus aethiops Jakovlev (Hemiptera: Reduviidae) - new to Britain, from South Yorkshire British Journal of Entomology and Natural History 26(4): 185-186
 Ryan, Rob (2013) Recent changes to the British list of the Hemiptera-Heteroptera British Journal of Entomology and Natural History 26(4): 209-210

Lists of insects of Great Britain

Hemiptera by location